Gjennestad or Ginnestad is a village in Arendal municipality in Agder county, Norway. The village is located a short distance north of the river Nidelva, just off Norwegian County Road 407.

References

Villages in Agder
Arendal